Owerri is the capital city of Imo State in Nigeria, set in the heart of Igboland. It is also the state's largest city, followed by Orlu, Okigwe and Ohaji/Egbema. Owerri is bordered by the Otamiri River to the east and the Nworie River to the south. The Owerri Slogan is Heartland.

History 
Owerri was the last of three capitals of the Republic of Biafra in 1969. The capital of the secessionist state was continuously being moved as Nigerian troops captured the older capitals. Enugu and Umuahia were the other capitals before Owerri. Present-day Owerri does contain some statuary memorializing the war, particularly in locations which suffered heavy bombing, but most war artifacts and history are located in the museum at Umuahia, Abia State. On 5 April 2021, a mass prison break happened in Owerri, in which 1,844 inmates were released. It is alleged that the Eastern Security Network was responsible for the attack.

Transport and trade 

The Airport (Sam Mbakwe Airport) provides flight services to Abuja, Lagos, Port Harcourt, and Enugu. Right now, it serves as an alternate for Port Harcourt. Sam Mbakwe International Cargo Airport is now an International Cargo Airport. Some major roads that go through the city are; Port Harcourt Rd., Aba Rd., Onitsha Rd., and Okigwe Rd. Roads within the city are; Douglas Rd. , Weatheral Rd., Tetlow Rd., and Works Rd. Relief market is the main market in Owerri after the demolition of Eke Ukwu Owere.

Owerri sits in the rain forest and produces many agricultural products, such as yams, cassava, taro, corn, rubber and palm products. Owerri also sits on huge crude oil and natural gas reserves like most of the Igbo land areas.

Climate
Owerri has a tropical wet climate according to the Köppen-Geiger system. Rain falls for most months of the year with a brief dry season. The Harmattan affects the city in the early periods of the dry season and it is noticeably less pronounced than in other cities in Nigeria. The average temperature is 26.4 °C.

Education

Universities/tertiary institutions 
 African University of Science and Technology  (AIST CCE Owerri)
 Federal Polytechnic, Nekede
 Federal University of Technology Owerri
 Imo State University

 Alvan Ikoku College of Education
 Federal College of Land Resources, Oforola
 Government Technical college Owerri
 Imo State Polytechnic, Umuagwo
 Owerri MSME Business School Aladinma Housing Estate, Owerri
 Seat of Wisdom Seminary Owerri

Secondary/high schools 
 Federal Government Girls' College, Owerri

 Army Day Secondary School, Obinze
 Christ the King Secondary School, Obike
 Community Secondary School, Oforola, Owerri
 Development Secondary School Owerri
 Emmanuel College Owerri
 Government Secondary School Owerri
 Holy Ghost College Owerri
 Madonna Model Secondary School, Owerri
 Methodist High School, Owerri
 Obube Comprehensive Secondary School (Egbelu Obube)
 Obube Secondary School
 Owerri Girls Secondary School
 Pearlville Secondary School.
 Our Lady of Mount Carmel College Emekuku, Owerri

Food 
One major food that is particular to the Owerri people is known as ofe owerri (ofe means soup, while Owerri is the capital of Imo state). It is sometimes referred to as the king of soup and in some Igbo communities, beautiful women are sometimes likened to Ofe Owerri. Ingredients for the soup, include snails,  (cow skin), goat meat, okporoko (dried hake fish), dried fish, oporo (smoked prawns), grounded dried crayfish, wraps of ogili (fermented soya beans), fresh pepper, grounded dried pepper, grounded uziza seeds (Ashanti pepper), cocoyam, palm oil, sliced ugu leaves (pumpkin leaves), sliced oha leaves, sliced uziza leaves, stock cubes, achi powder and salt.

Sports 
Owerri has a major Nigerian football club: Heartland F.C. It was known previously as Iwuanyawu Nationale, but the team retained its nickname: The Naze Millionaires. Popular super Eagle players hails from owerri, people like Emmanuel Emenike, Kelechi Iheanacho who played for major English clubs like Manchester City F.C. and Leicester City F.C., Former Inter Milan, Arsenal, Portsmouth F.C. striker and Nigeria national football team player Nwankwo Kanu was born and raised in Owerri. He attended Holy Ghost College, a renowned local secondary school in the Owerri town.

Religion 
Christianity is the dominant religion in Owerri. Catholics and Anglicans have the largest followings and Owerri is home to Assumpta Cathedral, the seat of the Roman Catholic Archdiocese of Owerri (Latin: Archidioecesis Overriensis) and the Seat of Wisdom Seminary. The archdiocese covers an area of 2,996 square kilometres. 670,986 of the 1.7 million people in the area are members of the Catholic Church. All Saints Cathedral, Egbu is the first and Largest Anglican Church in Owerri and the home of first Igbo translated Bible.

Gallery

See also 
 Ihitte Ogwa

References

 
State capitals in Nigeria
Cities in Imo State
Towns in Igboland